Amy Howe is an American gambling executive. She is currently the CEO of FanDuel. She is a frequent evangelist of live entertainment.

Early life and education 
Howe was born in Eden, New York, a suburb of Buffalo. There she attended Eden Junior / Senior High School. In 1994, Howe received a Bachelor of Science (B.S.) in Business, Management, Marketing, and Related Support Services from Cornell University. In 1999 she received an Master of Business Administration (MBA) in Marketing/Marketing Management from the University of Pennsylvania's Wharton Business School.

Career 
Howe began her career at Accenture as a business analyst in 1994. In 1997 she left Accenture to pursue her MBA. She then joined McKinsey & Company and worked her way up to partner over her 14 years with the company. She was recruited to Live Nation by CEO Michael Rapino and joined the company as the Chief Strategy Officer in 2014. 

In 2015 she took the position of Ticketmaster North America COO. In 2020, Amy Howe, the COO of Ticketmaster, has left the business.

In 2021, Amy was appointed to the President of FanDuel.

Honors 
In 2015, she was named to Billboard's Women In Music 2015: The 50 Most Powerful Executives in the Industry list. In 2016, she was named to Billboard's Women In Music 2016: The 100 Most Powerful Executives list. In 2017, she was named to Billboard's Women in Music 2017: The Most Powerful Executives in the Industry list. Howe was also nominated to the 2017 Sports Business Journal Game Changers list and listed on the National Diversity Council's 2018 list of the Top 50 Most Powerful Women in Technology.

Boards 
Howe is one of the Live Nation executives that advise and mentor the companies selected by the Women Nation Fund, an early-stage investment fund that invests in companies founded by women that provide a product or service in the live entertainment space.

Personal life 
She married Steve Howe, the SVP and CFO of The Wonderful Company, in 2009 and together they live in Brentwood with their three sons; Grant, Luke, and Dylan.

References

External links
 Facebook profile

Living people
21st-century American businesspeople
American chief operating officers
American computer businesspeople
American management consultants
American technology executives
American technology writers
Cornell University alumni
McKinsey & Company people
People from Eden, New York
American women business executives
Year of birth missing (living people)
21st-century American businesswomen
Businesspeople from New York (state)